General Mitchell may refer to:

Billy Mitchell (1879–1936), U.S. Army brigadier general (rescinded), posthumously appointed major general
Daniel G. Mitchell (fl. 1980s–2020s), U.S. Army major general
Edith Mitchell (born 1948), U.S. Air Force brigadier general
Francis Mitchell (British Army officer) (1904–1954), British Army major general
John Mitchell (born 1785) (1785–1859), British Army major general
John G. Mitchell (general) (1838–1894), Union Army brigadier general and brevet major general
Ralph J. Mitchell (1891–1970), U.S. Marine Corps lieutenant general
Robert Mitchell (congressman) (1778–1848), Ohio Militia brigadier general
Robert Byington Mitchell (1823–1882), Union Army brigadier general

See also
Ormsby M. Mitchel (1810–1862), Union Army major general
Attorney General Mitchell (disambiguation)